Leasburg Dam State Park is a state park of New Mexico, United States, located on the Rio Grande. It provides opportunities for camping, hiking, picnicking, swimming, and wildlife viewing.

The dam at Leasburg was completed in 1908.  Its purpose is not to hold back the flow of the river, but instead to divert it into a system of canals for use by nearby farms.

Known for its rich history, early settlers used the area as a passage to Jornada del Muerto, the nearby site of a 19th-century army outpost is a reminder of a time not too long ago. Leasburg Dam State Park offers year-round camping, picnicking, and birdwatching. From about mid-March to mid-October the park is also a venue for fishing, canoeing, and kayaking in the Rio Grande.  The dam channels water from the Rio Grande for irrigation in the Mesilla Valley. Nearby a museum and a number of trails are located near Fort Seldon State Monument.

References

External links
 Leasburg Dam State Park

State parks of New Mexico
Parks in Doña Ana County, New Mexico
Protected areas established in 1971
Rio Grande